Phrynoponera bequaerti is an Afrotropical species of ant in the subfamily Ponerinae. The species is almost as common and  widespread as Phrynoponera gabonensis and by far the smallest species in the genus. P. bequaerti is easily recognized by its size, lack of clypeal teeth and short, broad funicular segments. Unlike P. gabonensis and P. sveni, P. bequaerti has not been found in termitaries.

References

External links

Ponerinae
Insects described in 1922
Hymenoptera of Africa